The Ouray Historic District, in Ouray, Colorado, is a  historic district which was listed on the National Register of Historic Places in 1983.  Many of the commercial buildings are Italianate in style; many residences are Victorian.

Its 270 contributing buildings include government and commercial buildings:
Ouray County Courthouse (1881)
Beaumont Hotel (1886)
Wright Opera House (1888), with an elaborate Mesker Brothers cast-iron facade
Duckett's Market
St. Elmo Hotel (1899)
Story Block (1892)

Many of the commercial buildings are along Ouray's Main Street, also known as Third Street, which is U.S. Highway 550.

Residences include:
Hurlbutt House (1888)

The historic district encompasses almost all of the original townsite.  Its boundary is an irregular pattern extending to and including the Ouray hot springs pool on the north, to the west side of Oak Street on the west side of the Uncompahgre River on the west, to the south side of Third Avenue on the south, and to the east side of 6th Street on the east.

References

External links

Historic districts on the National Register of Historic Places in Colorado
National Register of Historic Places in Ouray County, Colorado
Italianate architecture in Colorado
Victorian architecture in Colorado